A gazette is an official journal, a newspaper of record, or simply a newspaper.

In English and French speaking countries, newspaper publishers have applied the name Gazette since the 17th century; today, numerous weekly and daily newspapers bear the name The Gazette.

Etymology
Gazette is a loanword from the French language, which is, in turn, a 16th-century permutation of the Italian gazzetta, which is the name of a particular Venetian coin. Gazzetta became an epithet for newspaper during the early and middle 16th century, when the first Venetian newspapers cost one gazzetta. (Compare with other vernacularisms from publishing lingo, such as the British penny dreadful and the American dime novel.) This loanword, with its various corruptions, persists in numerous modern languages (Slavic languages, Turkic languages).

Government gazettes

In England, with the 1700 founding of The Oxford Gazette (which became the London Gazette), the word gazette came to indicate a public journal of the government; today, such a journal is sometimes called a government gazette. For some governments, publishing information in a gazette was or is a legal necessity by which official documents come into force and enter the public domain. Such is the case for documents published in Royal Thai Government Gazette (est. 1858), and in The Gazette of India (est. 1950).

The government of the United Kingdom requires government gazettes of its member countries. Publication of the Edinburgh Gazette, the official government newspaper in Scotland, began in 1699. The Dublin Gazette of Ireland followed in 1705, but ceased when the Irish Free State seceded from the United Kingdom in 1922; the Iris Oifigiúil (Irish: Official Gazette) replaced it. The Belfast Gazette of Northern Ireland published its first issue in 1921.

Gazette as a verb
Chiefly in British English, the transitive verb to gazette means "to announce or publish in a gazette"; especially where gazette refers to a public journal or a newspaper of record. For example, "Lake Nakuru was gazetted as a bird sanctuary in 1960 and upgraded to National Park status in 1968." British Army personnel decorations, promotions, and officer commissions are gazetted in the London Gazette, the "Official Newspaper of Record for the United Kingdom". Gazettal (a noun) is the act of gazetting; for example, "the gazettal of the bird sanctuary".

See also
 Gazetteer
 List of British colonial gazettes
 List of English words of French origin
 List of government gazettes

References

External links

 
Newspaper terminology
Italian inventions
Westminster system×××·